Beauty B. Turner (October 23, 1957 – December 18, 2008) was an American housing activist and journalist from Chicago, Illinois. At the time of her death, Turner was compared to the civil rights leader Ida B. Wells.

Biography

Career
Turner was well known for her Ghetto (Greatest History Ever Told To Our People) Bus Tours, which "gave a voice to those who had none". Turner was associate editor of Chicago (South) Street Journal and a columnist for the Hyde Park Herald and a number of other local newspapers. Turner was also an activist in the community. For sixteen years, Turner was a resident of the Robert Taylor Homes, one of the US's best known public housing projects. Towards the end of her career, Turner worked as a research assistant for Professor Sudhir Venkatesh, a sociologist at Columbia University. Her writings have appeared on the front page of The Wall Street Journal.

Awards and honors
Turner won a number of awards through her career as a journalist, which include:

First New America Award by the National Society of Professional Journalists
Winner of a Studs Terkel
Peter Lisagor
Associated Press award
Chicago Association for Black Journalist award
Courageous voice award for her community activism
Black Pearl award
Woman of the Century award
Shero award from the Empowerment Zone Committee

Personal life and death
Turner had three children (two sons and a daughter); Larry Turner (born 1975), Landon (born 1980) and LaTanya Turner (Taylor) (born in 1977). Turner's grandson is Reezy Turner. Turner died on December 18, 2008, at the age of 51. She suffered from an aneurysm and fell into a coma and never recovered. She died at Rush University Medical Center.

References

1957 births
2008 deaths
American women journalists
People from Chicago
American community activists
African-American activists
20th-century American journalists
20th-century African-American women
20th-century African-American people
21st-century African-American people
21st-century African-American women